Sadika Parvin Popy (born 10 September 1979) known mononymously as Popy, is a Bangladeshi film actress. She won Bangladesh National Film Award for Best Actress three times for the films Karagar (2003), Megher Koley Roud (2008) and Gangajatra (2009)

Early life
A native of Khulna, she attended the National Girls' School, Gobar Chaka, Khulna.

Career
Popy's first role was in director Sohanur Rahman Sohan's film Amar Ghor Amar Behesht, but before it was released she made her film debut in Coolie (1997), directed by Montazur Rahman Akbar. She debuted in television drama in Nayak, directed by Shahidul Islam Khan. She performed in the web series, Garden and Indubala.

Filmography

Web series

Awards
National Film Awards

References

External links
 

 

Living people
People from Khulna
Bangladeshi film actresses
20th-century Bangladeshi actresses
21st-century Bangladeshi actresses
Best Actress National Film Awards (Bangladesh) winners
Best Actress Bachsas Award winners
1979 births